Sydney Secondary College is a multi-campus urban government-funded, co-educational, dual modality, partially academically selective and comprehensive secondary day school, located in the Inner West region of Sydney, New South Wales, Australia.

Campuses
The three campuses that make up Sydney Secondary College are:

 Leichhardt Campus: caters for students in years 7-10 only
 Balmain Campus: caters for students in years 7-10 only
 Blackwattle Bay Campus: caters for students in years 11-12 only

Students who enrol at either of the Balmain or Leichhardt Campuses usually continue to senior secondary school at the Blackwattle Bay Campus.

History

The college was formed in 2002, after a plan for revitalisation of public education in the inner-city was introduced. The three pre-existing independent high schools were linked to form Sydney Secondary College.  Facilities across the three campuses were renovated.

Starting from 2005, Leichhardt and Balmain became junior campuses (years 7-10), with an emphasis on middle schooling. Blackwattle Bay, formerly Glebe High School, became the specialist senior campus (11-12), being able to offer one of the widest curriculum choices in Sydney.

Leichhardt, while formerly the smallest school in NSW (in terms of area) has now expanded with a sporting oval, at the cost of A$6 million.

The founding College Principal was Mark Anderson AM who developed the college focus of 'quality, opportunity and diversity'.

Sport
Sport is compulsory for students in year 7-10 and on Tuesday afternoons. The junior Campuses have a strong sporting tradition and a friendly rivalry. If a student in year 7-10 decides not to participate in a grade sport, they can choose recreational sport, which consists of a mix of all sports. Various all-college events are held throughout the year, including the Swimming, Cross Country and Athletics Carnivals, and Gala Days. Blackwattle is on the waterfront, which allows students the opportunity to undertake rowing, dragonboat racing and kayaking as extracurricular activities.

Notable alumni

Renuga Veeranbadminton player; represented Australia at the 2012 Olympics

Jake Gordon Professional Rugby Union player; plays for the Australian National Rugby Union Team, and the NSW Waratahs in Super Rugby Pacific

See also 

 List of government schools in New South Wales
 List of selective high schools in New South Wales

References 

Educational institutions established in 2002
Public high schools in Sydney
2002 establishments in Australia
Selective schools in New South Wales
Inner West